Auldhouse  may refer to the following places in Scotland:
 Auldhouse, Glasgow
 Auldhouse, South Lanarkshire